Jakub Rakyta (born 5 February 2003) is a Slovak professional footballer who plays for Ružomberok as a midfielder.

Club career

MFK Ružomberok
Rakyta made his Fortuna Liga debut for Ružomberok against DAC Dunajská Streda at Štadión pod Čebraťom on 4 March 2022, replacing Filip Lichý.

References

External links
 MFK Ružomberok official club profile 
 Futbalnet profile 
 
 

2003 births
Living people
Slovak footballers
Slovakia youth international footballers
Association football midfielders
MFK Ružomberok players
Slovak Super Liga players